The Alaviyan Dome (Persian: گنبد علویان) is a 12th century mausoleum in Hamadan, Iran. A green colored dome once decorated the top of the building, as the poet Khaqani refers to be building as "the green dome", but has been destroyed by the passing of time. 

It was listed among the Iranian national heritage sites with the number 94 on 6 January 1932.

References 

Buildings and structures in Hamadan Province
National works of Iran
12th century in Iran
Mausoleums in Iran